The Journal of Pharmacy and Pharmacology is a monthly peer-reviewed scientific journal covering all aspects of pharmacy and pharmacology. It is published by Wiley-Blackwell on behalf of the Royal Pharmaceutical Society. It is an official journal of the British Pharmaceutical Conference. It was established in 1870 and acquired its current title in 1949. The editor-in-chief is D. Jones (Queen's University Belfast).

Abstracting and indexing 
The journal is abstracted and indexed in:

According to the Journal Citation Reports, the journal has a 2014 impact factor of 2.264, and in 2016 its ranking was 130/256 (Pharmacology & Pharmacy).

References

External links 
 

Pharmacology journals
Wiley-Blackwell academic journals
Publications established in 1870
Monthly journals
English-language journals